St. Jakobshalle is an arena in Münchenstein, near Basel, Switzerland. It is primarily used for indoor sports and concert events. The arena originally had capacity for 9,000 people and was opened in September 1976. It is the home of the Swiss Indoors men's tennis tournament.

The building has different sized halls and rooms, which are used for all types of events. Each year, the world's elite badminton players gather for their international grand prix tournament and the best European Sepak takraw players meet.

History

The Swiss Indoors men's annual tennis tournament is held at the St. Jakobshalle since 1975 and the Women's Top Volley International since 1989. International equestrian tournament CSI Basel is held at the venue every year since 2010.

Other sporting events include the 1986 World Men's Handball Championship, 1991 Swiss Open, 1998 IIHF World Championship, 2006 European Men's Handball Championship, 2019 BWF World Championships, 2024 European Women's Handball Championship, 2028 European Men's Handball Championship and the World Men's Curling Championship in 2012 and 2016.

It was the home of EHC Basel ice hockey team from 1976 to 2002 before the team moved to the St. Jakob Arena, which opened in October 2002.

According to Bob Dylan's biography Chronicles: Volume One, he decided after a concert at St. Jakobshalle to go on the Never Ending Tour.

Renovation
In January 2015, the Grand Council of Basel-Stadt approved a loan of CHF 105 million for the renovation and modernisation of the hall, with 89 votes in favor and one abstention. Between 2016 and 2018 the venue was comprehensively renovated and its technology upgraded to state-of-the-art. It reopened in October 2018 and now has a capacity of 12,400 in the main arena. The complex also houses a five smaller halls with variable capacity, a business center, VIP area, four gymnasiums and a 25-meter swimming pool. The car park has 1,465 spaces.

After the success of the Swiss tennis player and Basel native Roger Federer, the Basel sports director had announced the arena was to be renamed the 'Roger Federer Arena' following the current renovation, but this was blocked in a local council vote.

See also
 List of tennis stadiums by capacity
 List of indoor arenas in Switzerland

References

External links 

 

Indoor arenas in Switzerland
Buildings and structures in Basel-Landschaft
Sport in Basel
Münchenstein
Tennis venues in Switzerland
Handball venues in Switzerland
Badminton venues
Badminton in Switzerland
Sports venues completed in 1976
1976 establishments in Switzerland
20th-century architecture in Switzerland